NGC 296 is a low surface brightness unbarred spiral galaxy in the constellation of Pisces. The designation NGC 295 is sometimes mistakenly used for NGC 296.

See also
 Low-surface-brightness galaxy
 Spiral galaxy

References

External links
 

Pisces (constellation)
0296
Unbarred spiral galaxies
Low surface brightness galaxies
17840912